Wag the Dog is a 1997 American political satire black comedy film.

Wag the Dog may also refer to:

 Wag the Dog (novel), by Larry Beinhart, 1993, on which the film is based
 Wag the Dog (soundtrack), by Mark Knopfler, 1998, a soundtrack for the film
 Wag the dog, a political term for a situation in which a seemingly less important entity controls a more important one

See also 

 Tail wagging by dogs
 Wag (disambiguation)
 Wags the Dog, a mascot in the Australian children's band The Wiggles